Bhavanam Venkatrami Reddy (18 July 1931 – 7 April 2002) was the chief minister of the Indian state of Andhra Pradesh (AP) between February 1982 and September 1982. He was a member of the Congress party and served as cabinet minister in various AP governments.

His active carrier in politics started in 1970s. He started his political career as a Youth Congress activist. From there he reached the position of Member of Legislative Assembly later became education minister in Chenna Reddy's cabinet in 1978. He also served in the cabinet of Tanguturi Anjaiah before becoming chief minister on 24 February 1982. He only served as the chief minister for a brief period, until 19 September 1982, representing Indian National Congress.

He died on 7 April 2002 after brief illness. He was suffering respiratory issues. His wife to Bhavanam Jayaparadha is also a noted politician who served as State Minister. He was known to be a great leader who tirelessly worked for the welfare of people.

Personal life

Reddy was born in Muppalla village in Guntur District Madras Presidency then British India. Reddy married to Bhavanam Jayaparadha and has one son and three daughters. One of his daughters, Rajyasree, is married to cardiac surgeon and the founder of KIMS Hospitals, Bhaskar Rao Bollineni.

References

1932 births
2002 deaths
Telugu politicians
Chief Ministers of Andhra Pradesh
Indian National Congress politicians from Andhra Pradesh
Chief ministers from Indian National Congress
People from Guntur district